Francisco Vieira (26 August 1899 – deceased) was a Portuguese footballer who played as a goalkeeper.

Honours
Benfica
 Taça de Honra (1)

References

External links
 
 

1899 births
Portuguese footballers
Association football goalkeepers
S.L. Benfica footballers
Portugal international footballers
Year of death unknown